The Celluloid Closet is a 1995 American documentary film directed and written by Rob Epstein and Jeffrey Friedman. The film is based on Vito Russo's 1981 book The Celluloid Closet: Homosexuality in the Movies, and on lecture and film clip presentations he gave in 1972–1982. Russo had researched the history of how motion pictures, especially Hollywood films, had portrayed gay, lesbian, bisexual and transgender characters.

The film was given a limited release in select theatres, including the Castro Theatre in San Francisco in April 1996, and then shown on cable channel HBO as part of its series America Undercover.

Overview
The documentary interviews various men and women connected to the Hollywood industry to comment on various film clips and their own personal experiences with the treatment of LGBT characters in film. From the sissy characters to the censorship of the Hollywood Production Code, the coded gay characters and cruel stereotypes to the changes made in the early 1990s.

Vito Russo wanted his book to be transformed into a documentary film and helped out on the project until he died in 1990. Some critics of the documentary noted that it was less political than the book and ended on a more positive note. However, Russo had wanted the documentary to be entertaining and to reflect the positive changes that had occurred up to 1990.

Production
Russo approached Epstein about making a film version of The Celluloid Closet and wrote a proposal for the film version in 1986. However, it was not until Russo died in 1990 that Epstein and Friedman gained any traction on the project. After his death, Channel 4 in England approached the filmmakers about the film, and offered development funding in order to write a treatment “and most importantly to determine if it would even be possible to obtain the film clips from studios.”

After developing the project for years, fundraising remained the biggest obstacle. Lily Tomlin, the actress and comedian who narrated the film, launched a direct mail fundraising campaign in Vito Russo's honor. She also headlined a benefit at the Castro Theatre, which featured Robin Williams, Harvey Fierstein, and drag star Lypsinka. Steve Tisch, James Hormel, and Hugh Hefner offered “significant support”, and the filmmakers began to receive foundation funding from the Paul Robeson Fund, the California Council for the Humanities, and the Chicago Resource Center.

European television again played an important role in funding the project, when ZDF/arte signed on, but it was not until the filmmakers contacted HBO that they were able to begin production. In May 1994, “Lily Tomlin contacted Michael Fuchs, chairman of HBO, on behalf of the project. Epstein, Friedman, Tomlin, and Rosenman flew to New York for a meeting with Fuchs and HBO Vice President Sheila Nevins. At that meeting, HBO committed to supply the remainder of the budget.”

Credits
The following people are interviewed for the documentary.

 Lily Tomlin (narrator)
 Jay Presson Allen
 Susie Bright
 Quentin Crisp
 Tony Curtis
 Richard Dyer
 Arthur Laurents
 Armistead Maupin
 Whoopi Goldberg
 Jan Oxenberg
 Harvey Fierstein
 Gore Vidal
 Farley Granger
 Paul Rudnick
 Shirley MacLaine
 Barry Sandler
 Mart Crowley
 Antonio Fargas
 Tom Hanks
 Ron Nyswaner
 Daniel Melnick
 Harry Hamlin
 John Schlesinger
 Susan Sarandon
 Stewart Stern

DVD
In 2001, the DVD of the documentary includes a crew audio commentary, a second audio commentary with the late Russo, an interview Russo gave in 1990, and some deleted interviews put together into a second documentary titled Rescued from the Closet.

Impact
The Celluloid Closet had precursors in Parker Tyler's 1972 book Screening the Sexes and Richard Dyer's 1977 Gays and Film.

The film was released at a dramatic time in gay history, as Bill Clinton was elected president as the first major party presidential candidate to court and to promise openly to gay voters. However, the movement faced a huge public setback when "Don’t Ask, Don’t Tell" was passed. In response to these obstacles, the LGBT-rights movement became increasingly media focused, realizing that the images projected into the world negatively affected perceptions of homosexuality. In 1994, the Gay and Lesbian Alliance Against Defamation was formed as a national organization. The Celluloid Closet came out in 1996, as marches and protests against homosexual representation in film and television grew.

"Protests [were] aimed specifically at some of Hollywood's biggest and most prestigious films, including The Silence of the Lambs, which features a crazed transvestite who kills and flays women, and JFK, which has a scene in which gays alleged to be conspirators in the Kennedy assassination cavort in sadomasochistic fun and games". The article quoted above features an interview with Kate Sorensen, a member of Queer Nation, an organization that helped to organize the protests: "‘Every lesbian and bisexual character in these films is accused of being a psychotic killer ... And the girl never gets the girl. I'm tired of that.’” Gay activists across the country attacked films like these, where the homosexual character is portrayed as a disgustingly erotic killer.

It was believed that these portrayals reflected "a perverse fear of AIDS or the rising intolerance that [had] caused an increase in hate crimes of all kinds. Still, Hollywood's treatment of gays [hadn’t] helped. With few exceptions, the homosexual characters in films are creepy misfits or campy caricatures". The release of The Celluloid Closet further emphasized the twisted way homosexuals have been depicted throughout history. Addressing specific issues that were pertinent at the time, Russo exposes the existence of Hollywood homosexuals as well as the uncontrolled homophobia that keeps homosexuality in the closet on and off the screen.

"Russo essentially did for film what ACT UP did for AIDS awareness ... he opened up a world and a culture that had almost never been discussed before under any circumstances, exposing prejudices and hurts”. The film continued to motivate the need for positive representation of homosexuals. The Gay and Lesbian Alliance Against Defamation held seminars for staff at Columbia Pictures and Carolco. In addition, Hollywood Supports, a service organization with the mission to combat AIDS phobia and homophobia in the entertainment industry, was founded.

Accolades
Gay and Lesbian Alliance Against Defamation (GLAAD) gives an award called the Vito Russo Award to openly gay or lesbian people within the Hollywood film industry who advance the cause of fighting homophobia.

In addition the film was honored with four Emmy Award nominations in 1996. It was nominated for Outstanding Individual Achievement in Informational Programming for editing, sound recording and director of photography. It was also nominated for Outstanding Informational special. Additionally, the film received both a Peabody Award and recognition at the 1996 Sundance Film Festival by winning the Freedom of Expression award.

It was also nominated for the Truer Than Fiction Award at the 12th Independent Spirit Awards.

Films
The following is a list of film excerpts in The Celluloid Closet:

 48 Hrs. (1982)
 The Adventures of Priscilla, Queen of the Desert (1994)
 Advise & Consent (1962)
 Algie the Miner (1912)
 An Officer and a Gentleman (1982)
 Another Country (1984)
 Basic Instinct (1992)
 Behind the Screen (1916)
 Ben-Hur (1959)
 The Boys in the Band (1970)
 Boys on the Side (1995)
 Bride of Frankenstein (1935)
 Bringing Up Baby (1938)
 The Broadway Melody (1929)
 Butch Cassidy and the Sundance Kid (1969)
 Cabaret (1972)
 Caged (1950)
 Calamity Jane (1953)
 Call Her Savage (1932)
 Car Wash (1976)
 Cat on a Hot Tin Roof (1958)
 The Children's Hour (1961)
 The Chocolate War (1988)
 The Color Purple (1985)
 Continental Divide (1981)
 Crossfire (1947)
 Cruising (1980)
 The Crying Game (1992)
 Dancing Lady (1933)
 Desert Hearts (1985)
 The Detective (1968)
 Dickson Experimental Sound Film (1895)
 Dracula's Daughter (1936)
 Dream a Little Dream (1989)
 Edward II (1991)
 Fame (1936)
 The Fan (1981)
 A Florida Enchantment (1914)
 The Fox (1967)
 Freebie and the Bean (1974)
 Fried Green Tomatoes (1991)
 The Gay Divorcee (1934)
 Gentlemen Prefer Blondes (1953)
 Gilda (1946)
 Glengarry Glen Ross (1992)
 Go Fish (1994)
 Hairspray (1988)
 Heathers (1988)
 Heaven Help Us (1985)
 The Hours and Times (1991)
 The Hunger (1983)
 In a Lonely Place (1950)
 Johnny Guitar (1954)
 The Killing of Sister George (1968)
 La Cage Aux Folles (1978)
 Ladies They Talk About (1933)
 Lianna (1983)
 The Living End (1992)
 Longtime Companion (1990)
 The Lost Weekend (1945)
 Lover Come Back (1961)
 Making Love (1982)
 The Maltese Falcon (1941)
 Manslaughter (1922)
 Midnight Express (1978)
 Mo' Money (1992)
 Morocco (1930)
 Mrs. Doubtfire (1993)
 My Beautiful Laundrette (1985)
 My Bodyguard (1980)
 My Own Private Idaho (1991)
 Myrt and Marge (1933)
 Next Stop, Greenwich Village (1976)
 Night Shift (1982)
 North Dallas Forty (1979)
 Our Betters (1933)
 Parting Glances (1986)
 Partners (1982)
 Personal Best (1982)
 Philadelphia (1993)
 Pillow Talk (1959)
 Poison (1991)
 Queen Christina (1933)
 Rebecca (1940)
 Rebel Without a Cause (1955)
 Red River (1948)
 Repo Man (1984)
 Rope (1948)
 The Sergeant (1968)
 The Silence of the Lambs (1991)
 Silkwood (1983)
 The Soilers (1923)
 Some Like It Hot (1959)
 Spartacus (1960)
 Suddenly, Last Summer (1959)
 Sunday Bloody Sunday (1971)
 Swoon (1992)
 Tarzan and His Mate (1934)
 Tea and Sympathy (1956)
 Teen Wolf (1985)
 Their First Mistake (1932)
 Thelma & Louise (1991)
 Thunderbolt and Lightfoot (1974)
 Top Hat (1935)
 Torch Song Trilogy (1988)
 Vanishing Point (1971)
 Victim (1961)
 Victor/Victoria (1982)
 A View from the Bridge (1962)
 Walk on the Wild Side (1962)
 The Warriors (1979)
 The Wedding Banquet (1993)
 Wild at Heart (1990)
 Windows (1980)
 Wings (1927)
 Wonder Bar (1934)
 Young Man with a Horn (1950)

See also
 Lavender marriage
 List of lesbian, gay, bisexual or transgender-related films
 Disclosure: Trans Lives on Screen
Visible: Out on Television

References

External links
 
 
 

1995 films
1995 documentary films
1995 LGBT-related films
American documentary films
Books about film
Documentary films about Hollywood, Los Angeles
Films directed by Rob Epstein
Films directed by Jeffrey Friedman
Documentary films about LGBT film
Peabody Award-winning broadcasts
Sundance Film Festival award winners
Films scored by Carter Burwell
Film4 Productions films
HBO Films films
American LGBT-related films
Censorship of LGBT issues
1990s English-language films
1990s American films